John Amos Shea (September 7, 1910 – January 22, 2002), better known as Jack Shea or The Chief, was an American double-gold medalist in speed skating at the 1932 Winter Olympics.  He was the first American to win two gold medals at one Winter Olympics, and was the patriarch of the first family with three generations of Winter Olympians. Along with his compatriot Irving Jaffee, he was the most successful athlete at the 1932 Winter Olympics.

Career
Shea won gold medals in the 500-meter and 1500-meter events at the III Olympic Winter Games in his hometown of Lake Placid, New York. He also recited the Olympic Oath at the Games' opening ceremonies, which were presided over by then-New York State Governor Franklin D. Roosevelt.  Shea chose not to defend his Olympic titles at the 1936 Winter Olympics in Garmisch-Partenkirchen, at the request of a Lake Placid rabbi who asked him not to compete in Hitler's Germany.

Decades later, Shea played a major role in returning the Winter Olympics to Lake Placid in 1980 as a member of the 1980 Olympic Organizing Committee.  Afterward, he served as Vice Chairman of the Olympic Regional Development Authority, the organization that manages the venues used in the 1980 Games.

His son, Jim Shea Sr., was a 1964 Olympian in Nordic Combined and Cross Country Skiing; his grandson, Jim Shea Jr. was the gold medalist in men's Skeleton Sledding at the 2002 Winter Olympics in Salt Lake City. In the lead-up to the Salt Lake Games, Jack participated in the Olympic torch relay, lighting a cauldron at the speed skating oval in Lake Placid where he had won his medals in 1932. Shea was killed in a head-on automobile collision by a drunk driver 17 days before he was to watch his grandson participate in the Salt Lake Games.

Outside of sports
Shea attended Lake Placid High School, graduated from Dartmouth College and briefly attended Albany Law School, leaving to support his family during the Great Depression in a series of jobs in Lake Placid.  From 1958 to 1974, he was town Justice, and from 1974 until his retirement in 1983 he was the Supervisor of the town of North Elba.

See also
List of Olympic medalist families

References

External links
IOC 1932 Winter Olympics
PB's Jack and a link to results International Championships
Jack Shea at SkateResults.com
Jack Shea's U.S. Olympic Team bio
 

1910 births
2002 deaths
American male speed skaters
Speed skaters at the 1932 Winter Olympics
Olympic gold medalists for the United States in speed skating
Sportspeople from New York (state)
Road incident deaths in New York (state)
Medalists at the 1932 Winter Olympics
Oath takers at the Olympic Games